Nathalie Granger is a 1972 French drama film directed by Marguerite Duras.

Plot 
The film chronicles the monotony of a woman’s day. She and her friend are shown working in the garden, talking about their families and receiving the occasional visitor. The storyline mostly moves along without much dialogue, except when a washing machine salesman comes to call.

Cast
 Lucia Bosé - Isabelle 
 Jeanne Moreau - Other Woman
 Gérard Depardieu - Salesman
 Luce Garcia-Ville - Teacher
 Valerie Mascolo - Nathalie Granger
 Nathalie Bourgeois - Laurence
 Dionys Mascolo - Granger

References

External links
 
 New York Times review

1972 films
1972 drama films
French black-and-white films
Films directed by Marguerite Duras
French drama films
1970s French-language films
1970s French films